Wallows is an American alternative rock band based in Los Angeles composed of Dylan Minnette, Braeden Lemasters, and Cole Preston. The band began releasing songs independently in April 2017 starting with "Pleaser", which reached number two on the Spotify Global Viral 50 chart.

In 2018, Wallows signed a deal with Atlantic Records and released their major-label debut EP, Spring. The band released their debut studio album, Nothing Happens, in 2019, which featured the single "Are You Bored Yet?", followed by their 2020 EP Remote. The band released their second album Tell Me That It's Over in 2022.

History

As teenagers in 2011, Braeden Lemasters (guitar/vocals), Cole Preston (guitar/drums), and Dylan Minnette (guitar/vocals) formed a group called Join the Band with Zack Mendenhall (bass). They were students enrolled in the GigMasterz program at Keyboard Galleria Music Center in Southern California. They changed their name to Feaver and played the 2011 Warped Tour. They also used the name The Narwhals before settling on Wallows in 2017, now without Mendenhall.

In April 2017, the band released their first single under the Wallows moniker, "Pleaser". The song would eventually reach number two on the Spotify Global Viral 50 chart and number one on the KROQ Locals Only playlist. In May 2017, Wallows released a second single, "Sun Tan", and began playing live shows in the Los Angeles area, selling out The Roxy and the Troubadour. Their third single, "Uncomfortable", was released in September 2017.

In November 2017, their song "Pulling Leaves off Trees" premiered  on Zane Lowe's Beats 1 radio show. That month, the band also announced their first headlining North American tour that would run from January to March 2018. The tour started in San Francisco on January 24. In February 2018, the band announced that they had signed to Atlantic Records and were planning to release their major label debut EP, Spring, in April 2018. They also released a new single, "Pictures of Girls", their first on Atlantic. The song was chosen as a "Critical Cut" by SiriusXM Alt Nation.

Wallows ended their North American tour at South by Southwest in March 2018. Later in the month, they released a second track from Spring titled "These Days". The EP was released on April 6, 2018, by Atlantic Records and was produced by John Congleton.

On February 1, 2019, the band released a single titled "Are You Bored Yet?" featuring Clairo, along with a music video featuring cameo appearances from Noah Centineo and The Regrettes. The music video was subsequently nominated for an MTV Video Music Award in the "Best Push Performance of the Year" category. "Are You Bored Yet" was a certified  2× platinum single  by the RIAA, becoming the band's first song to be certified platinum. This song serves as the lead single to their debut album, Nothing Happens, released on March 22, 2019. The album received generally positive reviews and peaked at number 75 on the US  Billboard 200. It also reached No. 8 and 13 on the Billboard Alternative and Rock Album charts respectively.
 
Wallows embarked on another leg of their Nothing Happens Tour in February 2020, for 15 additional stops. The band partnered with local non-profit charities in each of the cities in this leg of the tour such as Project Lazarus and the LGBT Center of Raleigh. Before each show, the band posted a list of donatable items for their attendees to bring (with the incentive of donating being a free Wallows pin) on their social media accounts, and were able to garner a plethora of items to donate after each show. In an interview with 97X, a Tampa radio station, Minnette remarked that the nonprofit organization they partnered with in Fort Lauderdale, Florida, Handy Inc., shared that Wallows fans had brought an equivalent of five months' worth of supplies to the band's show.

On March 20, 2020, Wallows released a new single "OK" alongside a music video. On September 9, 2020, Wallows released another single "Nobody Gets Me (Like You)" alongside the announcement for their second major EP, Remote that was released on October 23, 2020. On February 15, 2021, Wallows announced a deluxe version of Remote alongside the release of a new single "Quarterback". The deluxe edition was released on February 19, 2021, with two new tracks, the previously released single, "OK", and a remixed version of "OK" that features Remi Wolf and Solomonophonic.

On September 30, 2021, Wallows released the single "I Don't Want to Talk". This song is the lead single off of their sophomore album, Tell Me That It's Over, released on March 25, 2022. Wallows embarked on their Tell Me That It's Over Tour in April 2022 and will be touring throughout 2022 and into 2023.

Musical style and influences
Wallows' musical style has mainly been described as alternative rock,
post-punk, power pop, indie rock, bedroom pop, indie pop and surf punk.

Wallows have cited Arctic Monkeys, The Strokes, The Libertines, Arcade Fire, Kanye West, and The Smiths as  some of the band's artistic influences.

Members
 Dylan Minnette – Born December 29, 1996 ( years old) Specializes in vocals, rhythm guitar, keyboards, bass guitar 
 Braeden Lemasters – Born January 27, 1996 ( years old) Specializes in vocals, lead guitar, bass guitar 
 Cole Preston – Born October 9, 1996 ( years old) Specializes in drums, guitar, keyboards, piano, backing vocals.

Discography

Albums

EPs

Singles

Notes

Tours 
Headlining

Nothing Happens Tour (2019—2020)
Tell Me That It's Over Tour (2022—2023)

Awards and nominations

References

External links

Official website

Atlantic Records artists
Alternative rock groups from California
Indie rock musical groups from California
American musical trios
Musical groups from Los Angeles
Surf music groups